Pats, Päts or PATS may refer to:

Sports teams
 New England Patriots, a National Football League team based in the Greater Boston area, United States
 St Patrick's Athletic F.C., an Irish association football club based in the Dublin suburb of Inchicore
 Montreal Pats, senior and junior ice hockey teams in Montreal, Quebec, Canada (1941–1942)
 Regina Pats, a junior hockey team based in Regina, Saskatchewan, Canada

People
 Konstantin Päts (1874–1956), politician of interwar Estonia
 Pats Acholonu (1936–2006), Justice of the Supreme Court of Nigeria

Acronym
 SecuriLock, Passive Anti-Theft System (PATS), an engine immobilization system developed by Ford
 Performance Analysis of Telecommunication Systems, a research group at the Department of Mathematics and Computer Science of the University of Antwerp
 Publicly Available Telephone Services
 RTMC Astronomy Expo, Pacific Astronomy and Telescope Show (PATS) that was held annually 2008–2012 in Pasadena, California

Other uses
 Pats Lake, Idaho, United States

See also
Pat (disambiguation)